Taneyev or Taneev is a Russian masculine surname, its feminine counterpart is Taneyeva or Taneeva. It may refer to

 Aleksandr Taneyev (1850–1918), Russian nationalist composer
Anna Vyrubova (née Taneyeva, 1884–1964), best friend and confidante of Russian Tsaritsa Alexandra Fyodorovna
 Sergei Taneyev (1856–1915), Russian composer, distant cousin of Aleksandr

References

Russian-language surnames